The National Statistics and Information Authority (NSIA), formerly the Central Statistics Organization (CSO), is the Afghan government agency charged with collecting and maintaining statistical data for Afghanistan.

The head office was in District 7 of Kabul.

It was first established in 1972.

References

External links
 NSIA website

Government of Afghanistan
Afghanistan
1972 establishments in Afghanistan
Government agencies in Afghanistan